The Palestinian Arab Party ( ‘Al-Hizb al-'Arabi al-Filastini) was a political party in Palestine established by the influential Husayni family in May 1935. Jamal al-Husayni was the founder and chairman.  Emil Ghuri was elected general secretary until the end of the British Mandate in 1947. Other leaders of the party included Saed al-dean Al-Aref, Rafiq al-Tamimi, Tawfiq al-Husayni, Anwar al-Khatib, Kamil al-Dajani, and Yusuf Sahyun.

The party was set up after the rival Nashashibi family established their National Defence Party. Other parties at the time included the pan-Arabist Youth Congress Party and the Independence Party (Hizb al-Istiqlal al-'Arabi, also known as the Arab Istiqlal Party), as well as the Reform Party and the National Bloc, established by public activists on a personal and local basis, and the National Liberation League in Palestine, an organization founded by the Palestine Communist Party.

The objectives of the party were independence for Palestine and an end of the Mandate, the preservation of the Arab majority in the country,  opposition to Zionism and closer relations between Palestine and other Arab countries. It was the largest of the Arab political parties formed in Palestine during the 1930s.

Abd al-Qadir al-Husayni was a member of the party and served as secretary-general and became editor-in-chief of the party's paper Al-Liwa’ and other newspapers, including Al-Jami’a Al-Islamiyya.

Jamal al-Husayni represented the party on the Arab Higher Committee, formed on 25 April 1936, during the 1936-39 Arab revolt. Following the violence and assassinations instigated by the various Palestinian nationalist parties and the AHC in mid-1937, the British authorities outlawed the AHC in October 1937 and commenced to roundup its leaders, some of which were deported to the Seychelles. Jamal al-Husayni escaped to Syria, as did Abd al-Qadir al-Husayni. They, as well as Amin al-Husayni, were involved in the 1941 pro-Nazi Rashidi revolt in Iraq. Jamal was captured by the British and interned in Southern Rhodesia, where he was held until November 1945 when he was allowed to move to Cairo.<ref>Pappe, Ilan (2002) 'The Rise and Fall of a Palestinian Dynasty. The Husaynis 1700-1948. AL Saqi edition 2010. . pp.309,321</ref>

During Jamal's incarceration, the party was re-established in 1942 with Saleh al-Husayni, Jamal's brother, as acting president and Emil Ghuri, a Christian, as secretary.

References

Bibliography
Gelber, Yoav (1997). Jewish-Transjordanian Relations 1921-48: Alliance of Bars Sinister. London: Routledge. 
Pappé, Ilan (2003). History of Modern Palestine: One Land, Two Peoples''. Cambridge: Cambridge University Press. 

History of Mandatory Palestine
Political parties in Mandatory Palestine
Arab nationalist political parties
Arab nationalism in Mandatory Palestine
Political parties established in 1935
1935 establishments in Mandatory Palestine
Political parties disestablished in 1937
1937 disestablishments in Mandatory Palestine
Political parties established in 1942
1942 establishments in Mandatory Palestine
Political parties with year of disestablishment missing 
Mandatory Palestine in World War II